Krishna Pushkaralu is a festival of River Krishna which normally occurs once in every 12 years and is celebrated with much glory. The Pushkaram is observed for a period  of 12 days from the time of entry of Jupiter into Virgo (Kanya rasi). The festival is "theoretically" observed throughout the twelve months that the planet remains in that sign, but the first 12 days are considered most sacred as per the beliefs of Indians. Pushkaram has been an age old practice in southern states Andhra Pradesh, Karnataka and Telangana. In 2016, the celebration started on 12 August and ended on 23 August.

Ghats in Vijayawada: Padmavathi Ghat, Krishnaveni Ghat, Durga Ghat, Sithanagaram Ghat, Punnami Ghat, Bhavani Ghat, Pavithra Sangam (Ferry) Ghat

Ghats in Amaravathi: Shivalayam Ghat, Dhyana Buddha Ghat, Dharanikota Ghat

Ghats In Kurnool District: Patala Ganga Ghat (Srisailam), Sangameswaram River Ghat

Ghats in Gadwal, Mahaboob Nagar Juraala, Beechupally.

Ghats in Karnataka: Chikodi (Bagalkot), Raichur (Krishna Taluk)

References

Religious festivals in India
Water and Hinduism
Hindu festivals
Religious tourism in India
Festivals in Andhra Pradesh
Hindu pilgrimages